Anna Maria Sepp (born February 2, 1996) is an Estonian sailor. She and Kätlin Tammiste placed 19th in the 49erFX event at the 2016 Summer Olympics.

References

External links
 
 
 

1996 births
Living people
Estonian female sailors (sport)
Olympic sailors of Estonia
Sailors at the 2016 Summer Olympics – 49er FX